Colby High School is a public secondary school in Colby, Kansas, United States.  It is located at 1890 S. Franklin Avenue, and operated by Colby USD 315 school district.  It enrolls approximately 300 students every year.  The current principal is Ryan Muhlig.

History
Colby High School was founded in 1890.  As the community grew, so did the school, and eventually surrounding smaller schools in Levant, Kansas, and Gem, Kansas, were closed so students could attend classes at Colby. Until 1995, Colby High School was located on Third Street, but the need for a larger building was recognized, and thus emerged the building that accommodates the students and teachers now.

Notable alumni
Samuel Ramey, Class of 1960, American Opera singer
Mark Schultz, Class of 1989, musician
Nelson Toburen, Class of 1957, former professional football player for the Green Bay Packers

See also
 List of high schools in Kansas
 List of unified school districts in Kansas

References

External links
 Colby High School Website
 Colby High School Alumni Website

Public high schools in Kansas
Schools in Thomas County, Kansas
Educational institutions established in 1890
1890 establishments in Kansas